Sports is the debut studio album by American emo band Modern Baseball released December 2012 on Lame-O Records.

Background
Sports was written while the band members were attending college. The band had previously released the split EP Couples Therapy with fellow Philadelphia-based emo band Marietta and embarked on a short tour during the summer of 2012.

Sports was recorded in the Free Studios at Drexel University, where founding band members Jake Ewald and Bren Lukens attended. The album was engineered by Ian Farmer  before he joined the band himself. Looking back on recording, Ewald said "it was mostly our singer Bren doing most of the legwork 'cos we didn't have a real band yet".

Release
Sports was later released by Lame-O Records in December 2012.  On June 22, 2013, a music video was released for "The Weekend". In June and July, the group went on a short US tour with Mixtapes, You Blew It! and Light Years. Later in July, the group appeared at I Got Brains Fest. In November, the group appeared at The Fest.

Track listing

Personnel

Modern Baseball 
 Jake Ewald – lead vocals, guitar, bass, drums
 Bren Lukens – lead vocals, guitar

Additional musicians 

Adrianne Gold – vocals (tracks: 6, 11)
Corey Rader – upright bass (track 4)

Production 
Ian Farmer – engineer, producer
Ralph Nicastro – mixing
Zakk Cervini – mastering

References
Citations

Sources

External links
Modern Baseball Official Site

2012 debut albums
Lame-O Records albums
Modern Baseball albums